The two moons of Mars, Phobos and Deimos, are much smaller than Earth's Moon, greatly reducing the frequency of solar eclipses on that planet. Neither moon's apparent diameter is large enough to cover the disk of the Sun, and therefore they are annular solar eclipses and can also be considered transits.

Eclipses caused by Phobos

Due to the small size of Phobos (about ) and its rapid orbital motion, an observer on the surface of Mars would never experience a solar eclipse for longer than about thirty seconds.  Phobos also takes only 7 hours 39 minutes to orbit Mars, while a Martian day is 24 hours 37 minutes long, meaning that Phobos can create two eclipses per Martian day.  These are annular eclipses, because Phobos is not quite large enough or close enough to Mars to create a total solar eclipse.  The highest resolution, highest frame rate video of a Phobos transit has been recently released from the Mastcam-Z on Perseverance rover https://www.jpl.nasa.gov/news/nasas-perseverance-rover-captures-video-of-solar-eclipse-on-mars.

Transits caused by Deimos

Deimos is too small (about ) and too far from Mars to cause an eclipse. The best an observer on Mars would see is a small spot crossing the Sun's disc.

View from Earth
Both moons are too small to cast a shadow on Mars that can be seen from Earth. However, shortly after the first artificial satellites were placed in orbit around Mars, the shadow of Phobos was seen in pictures transmitted to Earth.
One of these photos was from the NASA rover Opportunity.

References

External links
 Eclipse of the Sun by Phobos

Solar eclipses by planet
Mars
Articles containing video clips